Nome Próprio is a 2008 Brazilian film directed by Murilo Salles. The film won three awards at the Gramado Film Festival, including Best Picture and Best Actress.

Synopsis 
In São Paulo, Camila dreams of writing a book. She creates a blog where she writes compulsively about her intense and sometimes inconsequential experiences. In living a complex existence, his obsession with writing also causes isolation.

Cast 
Leandra Leal	...	Camila
Frank Borges	...	Leo
Luciano Bortoluzzi	...	Magazine Editor
Luciana Brites	...	Aurora
Juliano Cazarré	...	Felipe
David Cejkinski	...	Guilherme
Milhem Cortaz	...	Locador

Awards 
2008 Gramado Film Festival
Best Picture 
Best Actress (for Leandra Leal)
Best Art Direction (for Pedro Paulo de Souza)

References

External links 
Nome Próprio on IMDb

Brazilian drama films
2008 films
2000s Portuguese-language films
2008 drama films